TECO or Teco may refer to:

Organisations
 Taipei Economic and Cultural Representative Office, a Taiwan representative office alternative to an embassy
 TECO Maritime, an international producer and supplier of cleaning systems for ships
 TECO Electric and Machinery, a Taiwanese company in electric motor, electric appliances and other businesses worldwide
 TECO Energy, an American electrical power company
 Technical Education Center Osceola, a secondary school in unincorporated Osceola County, Florida, US
 Telecooperation Office, a German research group in the field of pervasive Computing at the Karlsruhe Institute of Technology

Other uses
 TECO (text editor) ("Text Editor and Corrector", originally Tape Editor and Corrector), an early computer text editor
 TECO Line Streetcar, a streetcar line in Tampa, Florida, US
 Teco pottery, produced by American Terra Cotta Tile and Ceramic Company
 Teco (footballer) (born 1982), Brazilian footballer Wender Coelho da Silva